God's Money may refer to

God's Money (album), a 2005 album by Gang Gang Dance
God's Money (film), a 1959 Argentine film